Znojile is a small settlement in the hills north of Hudajužna in the Municipality of Tolmin in the Littoral region of Slovenia.

Name
The name Znojile is derived from *znoji(d)lo 'sunny or sun-facing area' from the verb *znojiti 'to be warmed by the sun'. The name therefore refers to the geographical orientation of the place.

References

External links
Znojile on Geopedia

Populated places in the Municipality of Tolmin